Terje Johanssen (4 June 1942, in Svolvær – 27 May 2005) was a Norwegian poet. He made his literary debut in 1975 with the poetry collection Vegen å gå. He was awarded the Gyldendal's Endowment in 1983, shared with Karin Bang.

References

1942 births
2005 deaths
People from Vågan
20th-century Norwegian poets
Norwegian male poets
20th-century Norwegian male writers